Holy Ghost Catholic Church is a Catholic parish located within the city of Dubuque, Iowa, United States.  It is part of the Archdiocese of Dubuque.  The church, school, rectory, and convent were listed together as a historic district on the National Register of Historic Places in 2011.

History

The parish was formed in 1896 in response to a population explosion in the northern parts of Dubuque.  Sacred Heart Church had been established in 1879, and a new large church capable of seating 1,100 was built in 1888.  But within a few years church officials realized that even with a new building that Sacred Heart wasn't able to keep up with the growing population.  In response Holy Ghost parish was formed.

A combination church and school structure was built at the 2900th block of what today is known as Central Avenue.  Within a few years a large church building designed by Guido Beck was built just to the north of the old building.

In July 2001, Wahlert High School and all Dubuque Catholic Elementary Schools and the Catholic Early Childhood Centers, joined to become a system called Holy Family Catholic Schools.  This resulted in the consolidation of and closure of several long time schools, including Holy Trinity, Nativity, Sacred Heart, St. Joseph Key West, St. Joseph The Worker, St. Mary's, and St. Patrick's. 
Besides Holy Ghost, the other remaining elementary schools are Resurrection Elementary School, St. Anthony Elementary School, and St. Columbkille Elementary School.

References

External links

 Parish Website
 Holy Family Catholic Schools Website

Religious organizations established in 1896
Roman Catholic churches completed in 1916
Roman Catholic churches in Dubuque, Iowa
National Register of Historic Places in Dubuque, Iowa
Churches on the National Register of Historic Places in Iowa
Historic districts on the National Register of Historic Places in Iowa
Romanesque Revival church buildings in Iowa
Historic districts in Dubuque, Iowa
20th-century Roman Catholic church buildings in the United States